Wilman Fernando Conde Roa, Jr. (born August 29, 1982 in Cali) is a Colombian footballer.

Career

Professional
Conde made his professional debut with Deportes Quindío during the 2000 campaign. His play at Quindío led to interest from the top Colombian sides, and in 2001 he joined Deportivo Cali and became a fixture at the club for the next three years. In 2004, he went to Cortuluá, followed by a brief spell at Ecuadorean side Aucas. After training with Club Atlético Tigre in Argentina and playing briefly for Real Cartagena, Conde signed with Millonarios and became a fixture in central defense.

After appearing in 33 matches for Millonarios, he was sold to the Chicago Fire of Major League Soccer for about $300,000 due to the money constraints of the Colombian club. Conde left Chicago after four seasons with them in MLS, where he had a lot of personal success with the team, despite not winning any trophies with the club. After a proposed move to Puebla fell through at the last minute, Conde moved to fellow Mexican side Atlas in December 2010. Conde made his debut for Atlas in the Mexican Primera División on January 8, 2011 scoring one goal in a 5-0 victory over Monarcas Morelia. Conde's season with Atlas was cut short as he had to have surgery on his left instep, which sidelined him for the rest of the year. Prior to the start of the 2012 season Conde agreed to terminate his contract with the Mexican club.

After terminating his contract with Atlas, Conde was rumored to be returning to Millonarios or to a club in Major League Soccer. On January 30, 2012 it was announced that New York Red Bulls had obtained the rights to Conde and consequently agreed to terms with the defender.

Following the 2012 season, Conde and the Red Bulls agreed to part ways.

International
Conde has represented Colombia at the under-15, under-17, under-20 and under-23 levels. In 2000, he helped Colombia win the Toulon Tournament in France.

Honors

Individual
MLS Best XI: 2009
Chicago Fire Defender of the Year: 2009

References

External links
 
 
 
 socceragencypro.com

1982 births
Living people
Colombian footballers
Deportes Quindío footballers
Deportivo Cali footballers
Cortuluá footballers
S.D. Aucas footballers
Real Cartagena footballers
Millonarios F.C. players
Chicago Fire FC players
Atlas F.C. footballers
New York Red Bulls players
Expatriate footballers in Ecuador
Expatriate soccer players in the United States
Expatriate footballers in Mexico
Colombian expatriate sportspeople in Ecuador
Colombian expatriate sportspeople in Mexico
Categoría Primera A players
Ecuadorian Serie A players
Liga MX players
Major League Soccer players
Major League Soccer All-Stars
Association football defenders
Footballers from Cali